Pierre Toussaint (27 June 1766 – June 30, 1853) was a Haitian-American hairdresser, philanthropist, and onetime slave brought to New York City by his owners in 1787. A candidate for sainthood, he was declared Venerable by Pope John Paul II in 1996.

Freed in 1807 after the death of his mistress, Pierre took the surname of "Toussaint" in honor of the hero of the Haitian Revolution. Toussaint also became a successful barber and used his wealth for various philanthropic causes. He also helped finance the construction of St. Patrick's Old Cathedral.

Credited as the de facto founder of Catholic Charities New York, Toussaint is the first and only layman to be buried in the crypt below the main altar of the current Saint Patrick's Cathedral on Fifth Avenue, generally reserved for bishops of the Archdiocese of New York.

Biography

Early life
Pierre was born into slavery on June 28, 1766, in what is now known as Haiti. He was the son of Ursule, and resided on the Artibonite plantation owned by the Bérard family. The plantation was located on the Artibonite River near Saint-Marc on the colony's west coast. His father's name is not known. He was known to have a sister Rosalie. His maternal grandmother, Zenobe Julien, was also a slave and was later freed by the Bérards for her family service. His maternal great-grandmother, Tonette, had been born in Africa, where she was sold into slavery and brought to Saint-Domingue. He was raised as a Catholic.

Pierre was educated as a child by the Bérard family's tutors and was trained as a house slave. The senior Bérards returned to France, taking Pierre with them, and their son Jean Bérard took over the plantation. As the tensions rose, which would lead to Haitian slaves and free people of color rising in rebellion, in 1797 Bérard and his second wife left the island for New York City, taking five of their slaves with them, including Pierre and Rosalie.

New York
Upon their arrival in New York, Bérard had Pierre apprenticed to one of New York's leading hairdressers. The master returned to Saint-Domingue to see to his property. After Jean Bérard died in St. Domingue of pleurisy, Pierre, who was becoming increasingly successful as a hairdresser in New York, voluntarily took on the support of Madame Bérard. His master had allowed him to keep much of his earnings from being hired out. (Pierre's kindness to his mistress was noted by one of her friends, Philip Jeremiah Schuyler's second wife Mary Schuyler, whose notes were a source for the 1854 memoir of Toussaint.) Madame Bérard eventually remarried, to Monsieur Nicolas, also from Saint-Domingue. On her deathbed, she made her husband promise to free Pierre from slavery.

As a very popular hairdresser among New York society's upper echelon, Toussaint earned a good living. He saved his money and paid for his sister Rosalie's freedom. They both still lived in what was then the Nicolas house. He was freed in 1807.

Catherine ("Kitty") Church Cruger, two years older than Toussaint, would become one of his key clients and friends. She was the daughter of John Barker Church (who would give the pistols to Hamilton for the duel in Weehawken) and Angelica Schuyler, the muse and confidante of Hamilton and Jefferson.

Due to connections among the French emigrant community in New York, Toussaint met people who knew the Bérards in Paris. He began a correspondence with them that lasted for some decades, particularly with Aurora Bérard, his godmother. The Bérards had lost their fortune in the French Revolution, during which Aurora's father died in prison and her mother soon after. Her other siblings had married in France. Toussaint also corresponded with friends in Haiti; his collected correspondence filled 15 bound volumes, as part of the documentation submitted by the Archdiocese of New York to the Holy See to support canonization.

Marriage and family
On August 5, 1811, Toussaint married Juliette Noel, a slave 20 years his junior, after purchasing her freedom. For four years, they continued to board at the Nicolas house. They adopted Euphemia, the daughter of his late sister Rosalie who had died of tuberculosis, raising the girl as their own. They provided for her education and music classes. In 1815, Nicolas and his wife moved to the American South. Together, the Toussaints began a career of charity among the poor of New York City, often taking baked goods to the children of the Orphan Asylum and donating money to its operations.

Charity
Toussaint attended daily Mass for 66 years at St. Peter's in New York. He owned a house on Franklin Street, where the Toussaints sheltered orphans and fostered numerous boys in succession. Toussaint supported them in getting an education and learning a trade; he sometimes helped them get their first jobs through his connections in the city.

They also organized a credit bureau, an employment agency, and a refuge for priests and needy travelers. Many Haitian refugees went to New York, and because Toussaint spoke both French and English, he frequently helped the new immigrants. He often arranged sales of goods so they could raise money to live on. He was "renowned for crossing barricades to nurse quarantined cholera patients" during an epidemic in New York.

Toussaint also helped raise money to build a new Catholic church in New York, which became Old St. Patrick's Cathedral on Mulberry Street. He was a benefactor of the first New York City Catholic school for Black children at St. Vincent de Paul on Canal Street.

Later years
Euphemia died before her adoptive parents, of tuberculosis, like her mother. Juliette died on May 14, 1851. Two years later, Pierre Toussaint died on June 30, 1853, at the age of 87. He was buried alongside his wife and Euphemia in the cemetery of St. Patrick's Old Cathedral on Mott Street.

Veneration

Canonization process 
In the 1950s, the John Boyle O'Reilly Committee for Interracial Justice, an Irish-American group devoted to social justice for blacks, began researching and publicizing Toussaint's life story.
Because of Toussaint's reputation of great charity, Cardinal Terence Cooke, then Archbishop of New York, authorized the formation of a canonization committee to study further. Based on their findings, in 1991, his successor, Cardinal John O'Connor, strongly supported Toussaint for sainthood and began the official process, according to him the title of Servant of God. O'Connor sent the needed documentation to the Vatican for this process. As part of it, the cardinal had Toussaint's body exhumed and examined. He was reinterred in the main cathedral (where, up until that point, only clerics had been buried). 
Toussaint was the first layman to be honored by burial in the crypt below the main altar of St Patrick's Cathedral on Fifth Avenue. The crypt is normally reserved for bishops of the Archdiocese of New York.
In 1996, Toussaint was declared Venerable by Pope John Paul II, the second step toward sainthood.

Legacy
1854, a biography, Memoir of Pierre Toussaint, Born a Slave in St. Domingo, was written by Hannah Farnham Sawyer Lee and published in Boston, one of the genres known as slave narratives. 
The Pierre Toussaint Haitian-Catholic Center in Miami, Florida, is named for him.
Toussaint Academy San Diego (formerly The Pierre Toussaint Academy of Arts and Sciences) is a residential secondary school for homeless 14–18-year-old youth founded by Father Joe Carroll in 1992 and operated as a component of Father Joe's Villages (formerly Saint Vincent de Paul Villages). Over 1100 youth have benefitted from a healthy, stable environment in which to develop identity, self-worth, a sense of belonging, and connection to community honoring Pierre Toussaint's legacy.
Toussaint is remembered for his good works by a series of portraits in Gracie Mansion.
In April 2021, a large section of Church Avenue in Brooklyn, New York was co-named as Pierre Toussaint Boulevard. 
The intersection next to St. Peter's (Toussaint's former parish) in Manhattan was named after him in 1998.
Sacred Heart University in Fairfield, Connecticut, has a residence hall named after him, called Pierre Toussaint Hall.

See also
List of American candidates for sainthood

References

External links
Hannah Farnham Sawyer Lee, Memoir of Pierre Toussaint, Born a Slave in St. Domingo, Boston: Crosby, Nichols, and Company, 1854; Documents of the American South, University of North Carolina
The Other Touissant by Ellen Tarry at the Open Library

1766 births
1853 deaths
Venerated Catholics by Pope John Paul II
People from Saint-Marc
Haitian slaves
Free Negroes
People who wrote slave narratives
French emigrants to the United States
Burials at St. Patrick's Old Cathedral
Burials at St. Patrick's Cathedral (Manhattan)
18th-century American slaves
Venerated African-American Catholics
19th-century American slaves
American hairdressers